Big Brother Brasil 14 was the fourteenth season of Big Brother Brasil which premiered January 14, 2014, with the season finale airing April 1, 2014 on the Rede Globo television network.

The show is produced by Endemol Globo and presented by journalist  and interviewer Pedro Bial. The season is officially confirmed since March 2012 as part of a millionaire contract between international Endemol and Rede Globo, which guaranteed the show's rights until 2016.

The grand prize is R$1.5 million with tax allowances, with a R$150,000 prize offered to the runner up and a R$50,000 prize offered to the 3rd place.

For the first time ever, three women reached together the Big Brother final. Also, for the first time, BBB had two female winners in back-to-back seasons.

Fitness model Vanessa Mesquita won the competition over lawyer Angela Munhoz and cam-girl Clara Aguilar with 53% of the final vote.

Production

Cast
Regional applications were due from March 26, 2013 to September 30, 2013. Regional auditions were held from June 22, 2013 to November 22, 2013 in ten different cities over Brazil.

National applications started on October 1, 2013 until November 15, 2013. The semi-finalist interviews were held late in November 2013 and the final casting interviews took place early in December 2013.

The game

Big Brother in fiction
A plot line on Rede Globo's primetime telenovela Amor à Vida, involved the character of Valdirene (Tatá Werneck) becoming a Big Brother Brasil housemate.

In the series, having dreamed of competing on the show, Valdirene ends up in a fake Glass house with Murilo (Emílio Orciollo Neto) and Jefferson (Celso Bernini). The trio was joined by blonde bombshell Ellen (Dani Vieira), who instantly became Val's greatest enemy. Ultimately, Valdirene "received" the most votes from the public (who did not actually vote) and secured a place in the Big Brother house.

Valdirene entered the actual Big Brother house on January 15, 2014, and her journey can be described as an emotional rollercoaster. During a 12 hour-stay, Valdirene kissed, celebrated and got involved in arguments with her fellow housemates (the actual Big Brother housemates who were instructed by the producers to play along with her).

In the morning of January 16, 2014, Valdirene was "evicted" after came in last in a fictional elimination challenge. She refused to leave and had to be carried by security on her way out of the house. Real footage of Valdirene in the house aired on the same day during episode 208 of Amor à Vida, with Tatá Werneck's improvisation acting skills being heavily praised by the critics and the public.

Big Brother Turbo
During the first week, for the first time ever, three housemates were evicted from the House (the first on day 3, the second on day 6 and the third on day 8) after separate rounds of nominations and public vote. This '3 weeks in 1' event was billed by the producers as BBB Turbo. On week 2, three more housemates left the game (the first on day 10, the second on day 13 and the third on day 15), resulting in six housemates evicted from the competition in the first two weeks.

Big Mother Brasil
On March 8 (day 54), in the International Women's Day, 7 mothers and 2 aunts, relatives of the 9 remaining housemates, entered the Big Brother Brasil house to celebrate that day. This was the twist promised by Boninho, chief director in his Twitter profile. The housemates could not see or touch their relatives because the house was divided by a wall, as occurred in the first week of Big Brother Brasil 9, which divided the house in side A and side B. An improvised house was assembled for the mothers and aunts. They stayed in the house until March 13.

On day 55, relatives had to vote for the housemate they want to win an immunity for week 8's nominations. Sol (Vanessa's mother) and Susi (Cássio's mother) voted for Clara. Ivone (Angela's mom) and Bel (Tatiele's mother) voted for Marcelo. Adriana (Clara's aunt) chose Vanessa. Márcia (Diego's mom) chose Cássio. Ledi (Aline's mom) voted for Diego. Leda (Marcelo's mom) and Zezinha (Valter's aunt) chose Angela. So, Clara, Marcelo and Angela tied with 2 votes each and Zezinha had the casting vote. She chose Angela to be immune.

On day 57, due to Aline's eviction, her mother Ledi, who was the relative most popular among viewers, had to leave the house too.

On day 59, after helping housemates in the HoH competition, mothers and aunts left the house.

Power of No

Big Phone

Housemates
The cast list was unveiled on January 7, 2014.

(ages stated at time of contest)

Future Appearances
In 2018, Franciele Grossi (née Almeida) and Diego Grossi appeared as a couple in Power Couple Brasil 3, they finished in 9th place after being ejected because of Diego's violent behaviour towards other housemates.

In 2018, Franciele Grossi appeared in Dancing Brasil 4, she finished in 13th place.

In 2019, Diego Grossi appeared in A Fazenda 11, he finished as 2nd Runner-Up

In 2022, Aline Dahlen appeared in Ilha Record 2, she quit the game, finishing in 12th place.

Voting history
 Key
  – Orange team
  – Purple team

Notes 

 :  On day 1, housemates competed in the first HoH competition. The housemates were divided into two teams. Amanda won it and her team (Purple) also won immunity for the first nominations.
 : At this nominations each group should nominate a housemate from Orange team. First, the Orange team nominated face to face one of them. The most voted was João, with 4 votes. Then, the Purple team nominated a member of Orange team in Diary Room. There was a tie vote between Clara and Diego, with 3 votes each. Amanda decided to nominate Diego.
 :  On day 4, housemates competed in the second HoH competition. The housemates were again divided into two teams with Leticia and Tatiele switching teams. Valter won it and his team (Orange) also won immunity for the second nominations.
 : Like last nominations, each team should nominate a housemate. First, the Purple team nominated face to face one of them. Amanda received 4 votes, Princy received 3 votes and Letícia, Rodrigo and Roni received 1 vote each, so Amanda was nominated.  Then, the immune team (Orange) nominated a member of the Purple team in the Diary Room. Princy received 4 votes, Roni received 3 votes and Marcelo received 1 vote, so Princy was also nominated.
 :  On day 6, housemates competed in the third HoH competition. Leticia and Tatiele switched back to their original teams. Tatiele won it, but this time, she had to choose only four housemates from her team (Purple) to win immunity. She chose Amanda, Bella, Junior and Roni.
 : The two housemates who received the most nominations would face eviction. Aline received the most votes with 5, while Rodrigo and Vanessa tied with 3 votes each. Head of Household Tatiele broke the tie and decided to nominate Rodrigo, so he and Aline joined Angela (HoH's choice) as this round's nominees.
 :  On day 8, housemates competed in the fourth HoH competition. Following Rodrigo's eviction and Tatiele being ineligible as current HoH, Angela switched over to the Purple team to even out the teams. Cássio won it, but like last time, he had to choose only four housemates from his team (Orange) to win immunity. He chose Diego, Letícia, Vagner and Valter.
 :  The two housemates who received the most nominations overall would face eviction. Vanessa received the most votes with 5, followed by Princy who received 4. Both joined Marcelo (HoH's choice) as this round's nominees.
 :  For winning the HoH challenge, Letícia have guaranteed immunity for next round's eviction.
 : The two housemates who received the most nominations overall would face eviction. Franciele received the most votes with 8, followed by Bella who received 2. Both joined Diego (HoH's choice) as this round's nominees.
 : For being the Purple team Recycler (the winner team of the sixth HoH competition), Marcelo had the right to choose the next HoH. He chose Roni.
 : The two housemates who received the most nominations overall would face eviction. Cássio received the most votes with 3, while Amanda, Diego and Vagner tied with 2 votes each. Head of Household Roni broke the tie and decided to nominate Vagner, so he and Cássio joined Franciele (HoH's choice) as this round's nominees.
 :  As HoH, Roni can choose two housemates from another team to gain an extra immunity. He chose Marcelo and Tatiele.
 :  Vanessa answered the Big Phone and should put three bracelets in three different housemates. On Sunday, she decided to which of the three gave an extra immunity (Clara) and who she nominated automatically for eviction (Marcelo).
 : Aline answered the Big Phone and was automatically nominated. She also had to put a black bracelet in the housemate that she would nominate on Sunday and keep both informations as secret until the live vote. She chose Letícia.
 : Since her vote as part of the Big Phone twist, Aline was not required to vote in the Diary Room along with her fellow housemates, so Letícia already had 1 vote even before the nominations began. The same process would happen again the following week.
 : Franciele and Vanessa tied with 5 votes each. Head of Household Marcelo broke the tie and decided to nominate Vanessa, so she joined Aline (Big Phone's victim) and Junior (HoH's choice) as this week's nominees.

 
 : Diego answered the Big Phone and was automatically nominated. He also had to put a black bracelet in the housemate that he would nominate on Sunday and keep both informations as secret until the live vote. He chose Aline.
 :  Due to a production error, Diego accidentally heard the same message Aline heard the previous week therefore, he was instructed to go to the Diary Room to hear the correct message that was: put a yellow bracelet in the housemate he wants to give an extra immunity. He chose Franciele. However, Diego's vote in Aline was not voided.
 : Aline and Cássio tied with 3 votes each. Head of Household Clara broke the tie and decided to nominate Cássio, so he joined Diego (Big Phone's victim) and Letícia (HoH's choice) as this week's nominees.
 :  Marcelo won a challenge on Sunday before the nominations and gained an extra immunity.
 : On day 52, Pedro Bial revealed to the audience that the winner of the Power of Immunity competition, instead of give immunity to someone else, would win the immunity. Tatiele won the PoI on day 54, but the housemates were only informed about the twist during the live nominations on day 55.
 :  On Big Mother Brasil twist, the mothers could choose one housemate to gain an extra immunity. Angela, Clara and Marcelo tied with 2 votes each. Valter's aunt (Head of Household at time) had the casting vote and gave the immunity to Angela.
 : Cássio answered the Big Phone and won the power to automatically nominate someone. He chose Vanessa.

 : Week 10 was the last week to featured Have and Have-Nots competition of the season. From this point on, housemates status would be permanent until the end of their stay in the house.

 : Week 10 featured the first double eviction of the season. Following the first eviction on day 69, the remaining housemates played a week's worth of game – including HoH and  nominations with the second eviction of the week taking place two days later in another live show on day 71, which featured another round of nominations.
 : Clara and Marcelo tied with 2 votes each. Head of Household Valter broke the tie and decided to nominate Marcelo, so he joined Tatiele (HoH's choice) as this round's nominees.

 : Week 11 featured the second double eviction of the season. Following the first eviction on day 73, the remaining housemates participated in the first part of the final HoH competition, with parts two and three to be played the next two days, followed by nominations and the final eviction taking place on day 76.

 
 : Week 11's first HoH competition was the last where the previous HoH (Valter) was ineligible to take part in. From this point on, all remaining housemates would be eligible to compete.
 : Angela and Clara tied with 2 votes each. Head of Household Marcelo broke the tie and decided to nominate Clara, so she joined Valter (HoH's choice) as this round's nominees.
 : Angela won the final Head of Household competition and nominated Vanessa for eviction. Since Clara and Marcelo's votes would cancel each other out, only Vanessa was eligible to nominate. She chose Marcelo to be the second nominee.
 : For the final, the public will vote for the housemate they want to win Big Brother Brasil 14.

Have and Have-Nots

Ratings and reception

Brazilian ratings
All numbers are in points and provided by IBOPE.

 In 2014, each point represents 65.000 households in São Paulo.

References

External links
 Official Site 

2014 Brazilian television seasons
14